The Anglican Church of St Mary Magdalene in Sparkford, Somerset, England was built in the 14th century. It is a Grade II* listed building.

History

The church was built in the 14th century. In 1824 the church was restored and the nave rebuilt.

The parish is part of the Cam Vale benefice within the Diocese of Bath and Wells.

Architecture

The stone building has hamstone dressings and slate roofs. It consists of a three-bay nave and a two-bay chancel with a small chapel and organ to the south. The three-stage tower has an embattled parapet and is supported by corner buttresses.

Most of the interior fittings are from the 19th century, but it does have a 17th-century altar table and pulpit. There are also unusual cast iron bench-ends.

The churchyard is the location of the 20th century philosopher and teacher, John Godolphin Bennett

See also  
 List of ecclesiastical parishes in the Diocese of Bath and Wells

References

Grade II* listed buildings in South Somerset
Grade II* listed churches in Somerset
Church of England church buildings in South Somerset